The 2015 Middlesbrough Borough Council election took place on 7 May 2015 to elect members of Middlesbrough Borough Council in England. It took place on the same day as the election for the Mayor of Middlesbrough, as well as the UK general election, and other local elections across England. Since the 2011 election, there had been boundary reviews, which resulted in two fewer seats on the council, many old wards being discontinued and new wards being formed.

Overall results

There are two fewer seats on the council as a result of a boundary review.

A total of 89,088 valid votes were cast and there were 645 rejected ballots.
The turnout was 55.62%.

Council Composition

Prior to the election the composition of the council was:

After the election the composition of the council was:

Con
MI - Marton Independents
L - Liberal Democrats
G - Green Party

Ward Results
An asterisk denotes an incumbent councillor.

Acklam

Ayresome

Berwick Hills and Pallister
This is a newly created ward, therefore there are no previous figures to compare the 2015 result to.

Dryden previously served as a councillor for the Pallister ward from 2011-2015.

Brambles and Thorntree

This is a newly created ward, therefore there are no previous figures to compare the 2015 result to.
Cllrs G Purvis and T Purvis were both previously councillors for the Thorntree ward.
Len Junier was previously the Labour cllr for North Ormesby & Brambles Farm.

Central

Coulby Newham

Hemlington

Kader

Ladgate

Linthorpe

This ward has changed from having 3 seats to 2 seats as a result of recent boundary changes, therefore there are no previous figures to compare the 2015 result to.

Longlands and Beechwood

This is a newly created ward, therefore there are no previous figures to compare the 2015 result to.

Cllrs McTigue and Rooney previously served as councillors from 2011-2015 in the Beachwood and Clairville wards respectively.

Marton East

This is a newly created ward, therefore there are no previous figures to compare the 2015 result to.

Both Cllrs Mawston and Davison were previously councillors for Marton Ward from 2011-2015.

Marton West

Newport

This is a newly created ward, therefore there are no previous figures to compare the 2015 result to.

Cllrs Brady and Harvey previously served as councillors for the Gresham ward from 2011-2015.

Sajaad Khan previously served as a Labour councillor in the Gresham ward from 2011-2015.

North Ormesby

This is a newly created ward, therefore there are no previous figures to compare the 2015 result to.

Nunthorpe

Park

Cllr Rostron previously served as councillor for Linthorpe from 2011-2015.

Park End and Beckfield

Cllrs Hubbard and Cox previously served as councillors in Beckfield, whilst Cllr Saunders served as a councillor for Park End.

Stainton and Thornton

This is a newly created ward, therefore there are no previous figures to compare the 2015 result to.

Trimdon

This is a newly created ward, therefore there are no previous figures to compare the 2015 result to.

Cllr J Sharrocks previously served as a councillor for the Brookfield ward from 2011-2015.

Peter Sharrocks previously served as a councillor for the Brookfield ward from 2011-2015.

References

2015 English local elections
May 2015 events in the United Kingdom
2015
21st century in Tyne and Wear